Keri Hill is a suburb of Auckland, in northern New Zealand. Located 32 kilometres to the southwest of Auckland CBD, under authority of the Auckland Council. The suburban area of Keri Hill pastoral lifestyle blocks overlooking Ardmore, Ardmore Airport, and Manukau Heights. The suburb is located between Red Hill and Ardmore incorporating a small residential and rural area.

External links
Auckland Council

Suburbs of Auckland